Bretby is a civil parish in the South Derbyshire district of Derbyshire, England.  The parish contains 13 listed buildings that are recorded in the National Heritage List for England.  Of these, two are listed at Grade II*, the middle of the three grades, and the others are at Grade II, the lowest grade.  The parish contains the village of Bretby and the surrounding countryside.  The listed buildings include houses, cottages and associated structures, a farmhouse and farm buildings, a church, a former school, a former watermill, a bottle kiln and factory, a war memorial and village pump, and a telephone kiosk.


Key

Buildings

References

Citations

Sources

 

Lists of listed buildings in Derbyshire